The Nazas chub (Gila conspersa) is a cyprinid fish endemic to  Mexico.

References

Chubs (fish)
Freshwater fish of Mexico
Gila (fish)
Fish described in 1881